Akbarabad-e Qushchi (also Romanized as Akbarābād-e Qūshchī; also known as Akbarābād) is a village in Aq Kahriz Rural District, Nowbaran District, Saveh County, Markazi Province, Iran. At the 2006 census, its population was 52, in 11 families.

References 

Populated places in Saveh County